Prairie du Long Township is located in St. Clair County, Illinois. As of the 2010 census, its population was 2,244 and it contained 864 housing units.

Geography

Demographics

References

External links
City-data.com
St. Clair County Official Site
Illinois State Archives
Prairie du Long Township Homepage

1883 establishments in Illinois
Populated places established in 1883
Townships in St. Clair County, Illinois
Townships in Illinois